The Zemitāni–Skulte Railway is a  long,  gauge railway in Latvia built in the 20th century to connect Riga and Rūjiena. The railway was originally part of the Mangaļi–Rūjiena Railway that opened 1937. In 1981 the line became part of the Riga–Tallinn Railway, with a travel time of five hours. The Zemitāni–Skulte Railway got its present length in 1996 due to the financial downturn following the collapse of the Soviet Union.

References 

Railway lines in Latvia
Transport in Riga
Railway lines opened in 1937
5 ft gauge railways in Latvia